JONG (English: Young) is a political party in The Netherlands.

History 
They were founded for youth rights.

The party contested in the 2021 Dutch general election, and won no seats.

Electoral history

References

See also 

 List of political parties in the Netherlands

Political parties established in 2017
2017 establishments in the Netherlands
Youth rights in Europe